Mbadi John Ng'ongo is a Kenyan politician. He belongs to the Orange Democratic Movement and was elected to represent the Gwassi Constituency in the National Assembly of Kenya since the 2007 Kenyan parliamentary election.

Education 
Mbadi attended Lingongo Primary School and  later joined Kokuro Boys Secondary School for his secondary education. He  attended the  University of Nairobi in1992 and graduated in 1996 with  a Bachelor of Commerce In 2004 _ 2007 he  obtained a Masters of Business Administration.

Career 
He Has been very vocal and instrumental in parliament and In September 2012, Mbadi was appointed the Assistant Minister in the Office of the Prime Minister, a position he held until the 2013 general elections. Mbadi is now Suba Constituency Member of Parliament after he was elected in the March 4th 2013 elections. Hon. Mbadi also serves as the minority leader in the National Assembly of Kenya. He was in the Public Accounts Committee that looked into the National Youth Service Scandal.

References

Members of the National Assembly (Kenya)
Living people
Year of birth missing (living people)
Orange Democratic Movement politicians